Lukowiec may refer to the following places:
Łukowiec, Kuyavian-Pomeranian Voivodeship (north-central Poland)
Łukowiec, Świętokrzyskie Voivodeship (south-central Poland)
Łukowiec, Masovian Voivodeship (east-central Poland)
Łukówiec, Mińsk County in Masovian Voivodeship (east-central Poland)
Łukówiec, Otwock County in Masovian Voivodeship (east-central Poland)
Łukówiec, Lublin Voivodeship (east Poland)